Ramón Hernández González (August 31, 1940 – February 4, 2009) was a relief pitcher in Major League Baseball who played all or part of nine seasons between  and , including three National League Championship Series for the Pittsburgh Pirates (1972, 1974–75). His most productive season came in 1972, when he finished 5–0 with a 1.67 ERA and 14 saves. A native of Carolina, Puerto Rico, he was a switch-hitter and threw left-handed.

In a nine-season career, Hernández posted a 23–15 record with a 3.03 ERA and 46 saves in 337 relief appearances, giving up 145 earned runs on 399 hits and 135 walks while striking out 255 in  innings of work.

Hernández died in Carolina, Puerto Rico, at the age of 68.

References

External links

MLB - obituary

1940 births
2009 deaths
Arkansas Travelers players
Atlanta Braves players
Boston Red Sox players
Broncos de Reynosa players
Charleston Charlies players
Chicago Cubs players
Dubuque Packers players
El Paso Sun Kings players
Grand Forks Chiefs players
Hawaii Islanders players
Major League Baseball pitchers
Major League Baseball players from Puerto Rico
Mexican League baseball pitchers
People from Carolina, Puerto Rico
Pittsburgh Pirates players
Puerto Rican expatriate baseball players in Mexico
San Jose Bees players
Seattle Angels players
Tulsa Oilers (baseball) players